Queshan railway station is a station on Beijing–Guangzhou railway in Queshan County, Zhumadian, Henan.

History
The station was established in 1903.

References

Railway stations in Henan
Stations on the Beijing–Guangzhou Railway
Railway stations in China opened in 1903